Preben Bang Henriksen (born 11 February 1954 in Nørresundby) is a Danish lawyer, author and politician, who is a member of the Folketing for the Venstre political party. He was elected into parliament at the 2011 Danish general election.

Background
He graduated as master of law from Aarhus University in 1979, became a solicitor in 1982, gained the right to appear before the High Court from 1982 and right to appear before the Supreme Court from 1986.

Bibliography
Erhvervslejeretten i hovedtræk (1990)
Erhvervslejeretten (1990)
Skolens lejemål (1990)
Erhvervslejemål - rettigheder og pligter efter den ny erhvervslejelov (2008)

External links 
 Biography on the website of the Danish Parliament (Folketinget)

References 

1954 births
Living people
People from Nørresundby
Aarhus University alumni
Venstre (Denmark) politicians
Danish writers
20th-century Danish lawyers
21st-century Danish lawyers
Members of the Folketing 2011–2015
Members of the Folketing 2015–2019
Members of the Folketing 2019–2022
Members of the Folketing 2022–2026